A horizon is a boundary in spacetime satisfying prescribed conditions.

There are several types of horizons that play a role in Albert Einstein's theory of general relativity:

 Absolute horizon, a boundary in spacetime in general relativity inside of which events cannot affect an external observer
 Event horizon, a boundary in spacetime beyond which events cannot affect the observer, thus referring to a black hole's boundary and the boundary of an expanding universe
 Apparent horizon, a surface defined in general relativity
 Cauchy horizon, a surface found in the study of Cauchy problems
 Cosmological horizon, a limit of observability
 Killing horizon, a null surface on which there is a Killing vector field
 Particle horizon, the maximum distance from which particles can have travelled to an observer in the age of the universe

General relativity